L&S may refer to:
L&S, commonly known as Leedy & Strupe, a company formed after the purchase of the Leedy Manufacturing Company
Laverne & Shirley, an American television situation comedy
Lilo & Stitch, Disney franchise
 the Lehigh and Susquehanna Railroad, a defunct railroad in Pennsylvania
A Latin Dictionary, often referred to as "Lewis and Short"